The Polynormande is a single-day road bicycle race held annually in August in the region of Normandy, France. Between 1980 and 2002 it was a criterium. Since 2003, the race is organized as a 1.1 event on the UCI Europe Tour, also being part of the French Road Cycling Cup.

Winners 

UCI Europe Tour races
Recurring sporting events established in 1980
1980 establishments in France
Cycle races in France
Normandy